Fuse is a Japanese surname. Notable people with the surname include:

, Japanese singer
, Japanese anatomist
, Japanese equestrian
, Japanese lawyer and activist
, Japanese origami artist and writer

Fictional characters
Kazuki Fuse, a character in the anime film Jin-Roh: The Wolf Brigade

Japanese-language surnames